Strangers 6 (Japanese: ストレンジャーズ6),,, is a 2012 Japanese-South Korean-Chinese co-production television series. With a budget of 1 billion yen, filming portion in Japan began on July 1, 2011. The first episode premiered in Japan on Wowow on January 27, 2012.

Cast
 Toshiaki Karasawa
 Oh Ji-ho
 Kim Hyo-jin
 Masaya Kikawada
 Bowie Lam
 Liu Xuan
 Kazuki Kitamura
 Misuzu Kanno
 Suzuka Morita
 Shinzo Hotta
 Gregory Wong
 Lorena Kotô
 Terence Yin
 Kim In-seo
 Tony Ho
 Philip Keung
 Noel Leung
 Ng Chi-hung

References

External links
 Official website

2012 Japanese television series debuts
Wowow original programming